Chula is a mostly rural unincorporated community in the northeastern part of Amelia County just west of the Appomattox River in the U.S. state of Virginia. The town is located along SR 636 (Lodore Road) and SR 740 (Old Chula Road) around their T-intersection. Chula is just west of SR 604 (Chula Road), which includes a short bypass segment built around the town in the late 20th century. The area is served by the post office 7 miles southwest at Amelia Court House, ZIP code 23002. The nearest fire station, Mattoax Volunteer Fire Department, is 3 miles north.

The word "Chula" may have been derived from a Native American term meaning "Red Fox". A post office using the name "Chula Depot" was established in 1857; a Confederate map shows the town as a stop on the newly completed Richmond and Danville Railroad. As of about 1900, after the R&D RR had been acquired by Southern Railway, Chula (or "Chula Station") was still a railroad stop as well as a post village; "Chula Depot" and "Chula Station" continued to appear as alternative names well into the 20th century. The railroad track is also still used, although only by freight trains; it crosses Route 636 at the main T-intersection and is now owned by the Norfolk Southern Railway.

During the Civil War, cavalry led by Union general August Kautz conducted raids against the Richmond and Danville Railroad in 1864. Union forces destroyed Chula Depot on March 13, but it was rebuilt. Confederate defenders clashed with Kautz's forces at Flat Creek Bridge, just north of Chula, on May 14.

Amelia County is located in a small Central Virginia tornado alley and has had numerous tornado touchdowns. Tornadoes of note include the April 30, 1924, twister that passed east of the courthouse area, traveling from Jetersville to the Chula vicinity, killing one person and injuring seven others.

Through the mid-20th century, Chula School was among the educational facilities serving African American children in Amelia County in the era before desegregation. A structure noted as historic Chula School stood approximately 2 miles south of town on what is now SR 683 (Chula School Road).

Dykeland, Egglestetton, Grub Hill Church, and The Wigwam are among the historic buildings around Chula that are listed on the National Register of Historic Places.

References

Unincorporated communities in Virginia
Unincorporated communities in Amelia County, Virginia